Rudolf Sloup known as Štapl (17 November 1895 – 7 September 1936) was a Czechoslovak footballer. He played 8 games and scored 8 goals for the Czechoslovakia national football team. He represented Czechoslovakia at the 1924 Olympics.

He was also a player-coach of Yugoslav side Hajduk Split in 1920. His younger brother Josef was also a footballer.

References

1895 births
1936 deaths
Czech footballers
Czechoslovak footballers
Czechoslovakia international footballers
SK Slavia Prague players
Olympic footballers of Czechoslovakia
Footballers at the 1924 Summer Olympics
Expatriate footballers in Yugoslavia
Expatriate football managers in Yugoslavia
Sportspeople from Plzeň
People from the Kingdom of Bohemia
Association football forwards
Czechoslovak football managers
Czechoslovak expatriate sportspeople in Yugoslavia
HNK Hajduk Split managers